Alan Dukes (born 1945) is an Irish former Fine Gael politician who served as Minister for Transport, Energy and Communication from 1996 to 1997, Leader of the Opposition and Leader of Fine Gael from 1987 to 1990, Minister for Justice from 1986 to 1987, Minister for Finance from 1982 to 1986 and Minister for Agriculture from 1981 to 1982. He served as a Teachta Dála (TD) from 1981 to 2002.

He held several major government positions, and is one of the few TDs to be appointed a Minister on their first day in the Dáil. He lost his seat in the 2002 general election. He was subsequently appointed Director General of the Institute of International and European Affairs, and chairman of Anglo Irish Bank.

Early life
Dukes was born in Drimnagh, Dublin in 1945. His father, James F. Dukes, was originally from Tralee, County Kerry, and was a senior civil servant, the founding chairman and chief executive of the Higher Education Authority, while his mother was from near Ballina, County Mayo.

The Dukes family originally came from the north of England. His grandfather had served with the Royal Engineers in World War I, and settled in Cork and then Kerry afterwards where he worked with the Post Office creating Ireland's telephone network. He also developed a keen interest in the Irish language.

He was educated by the Christian Brothers at Colaiste Mhuire, Parnell Square, Dublin, and was offered a number of scholarships for third level on graduation, including one for the Irish language. His interest in the Irish language continues to this day, and he regularly appears on Irish language television programmes.

On leaving school he attended University College Dublin, where he captained the fencing team to its first ever Intervarsity title.

Career before politics
He became an economist with the Irish Farmers' Association (IFA) in Dublin in 1969. After Ireland joined the European Economic Community (EEC) in 1973, he moved to Brussels where he was part of the IFA delegation. In this role he was influential in framing Ireland's contribution to the Common Agricultural Policy.

He moved on from this IFA position to become chief of staff to Ireland's EEC commissioner Dick Burke, a former Fine Gael politician.

Early political career 
In the 1979 European Parliament elections, Dukes stood as a Fine Gael candidate in the Munster constituency. He had strong support among the farming community, but the entry of farming leader T. J. Maher as an independent candidate hurt his chances of election. Maher subsequently topped the poll.

He stood again for Fine Gael at the 1981 general election in the expanded Kildare constituency, where he won a seat in the 22nd Dáil. On his first day in the Dáil, he was appointed Minister for Agriculture by the Taoiseach, Garret FitzGerald, becoming one of only nine TDs (as of 2021) so appointed. He was to represent Kildare for 21 years.

This minority Fine Gael–Labour Party coalition government collapsed in February 1982 over controversial budget reforms, but returned to power with a working majority in December 1982. Dukes was again called into the cabinet becoming Minister for Finance less than two years into his Dáil career.

He faced a difficult task as Finance Minister at this time. Ireland was heavily in debt while unemployment and emigration were high. Many of Fine Gael's ambitious plans had to be deferred while the Fine Gael–Labour Party coalition disagreed on how to solve the economic crisis. The challenge of addressing the national finances was made difficult by electoral arithmetic and a lack of support from the opposition Fianna Fáil party led by Charles Haughey.

Dukes remained in the Department of Finance until a reshuffle in February 1986 when he was appointed the Minister for Justice.

Leadership of Fine Gael

Fine Gael failed to be returned to government at the 1987 general election and lost 19 of its 70 seats, mostly to the new Progressive Democrats party. Outgoing Taoiseach and leader Garret FitzGerald stepped down and Dukes was elected leader of Fine Gael. He also became Leader of the Opposition.

This was a difficult time for the country. Haughey's Fianna Fáil had fought the election on promises to increase spending and government services, and by attacking the cutbacks favoured by Fine Gael. The campaign produced the famous Fianna Fáil slogan that cuts in health spending affect the "old, the sick and the handicapped". However, on taking office, the new Taoiseach and his Finance Minister Ray MacSharry immediately drew up a drastic set of cutbacks including a spate of ward and hospital closures. This presented a political opportunity for the opposition to attack the government.

However, while addressing a meeting of the Tallaght Chamber of Commerce, Dukes announced that:

This bold step became known as the Tallaght Strategy, and represented a major departure in Irish politics whereby Fine Gael would vote with the minority Fianna Fáil Government if it adopted Fine Gael's economic policies for revitalising the economy.

The consequences of this statement were huge. The Haughey government was able to take severe corrective steps to restructure the economy and lay the foundations for the economic boom of the nineties. However, at a snap election in 1989 Dukes did not receive electoral credit for his statesmanlike approach, and the party only made minor gains, reclaiming five of the lost seats. The outcome was the first ever coalition government for Fianna Fáil, whose junior partner was the Progressive Democrats led by former Fianna Fáil TD Desmond O'Malley.

1990 presidential election and loss of the leadership
Dukes received little credit for the Tallaght Strategy, and the party's failure to make significant gains in 1989 left some Fine Gael TDs with a desire for a change at the top of the party. Their opportunity came in the wake of the historic 1990 presidential election. Fine Gael chose Austin Currie TD as their candidate. He had been a leading member of the Northern Ireland Civil Rights Association movement in the 1960s, and had been a member of the Social Democratic and Labour Party (SDLP) before moving south.

Initially, Fianna Fáil's Brian Lenihan Snr was favourite to win. However, after several controversies arose, relating to the brief Fianna Fáil administration of 1982, and Lenihan's dismissal as Minister for Defence midway through the campaign, the Labour Party's Mary Robinson emerged victorious. To many in Fine Gael, the humiliation of finishing third was too much to bear and a campaign was launched against Dukes' leadership. He was subsequently replaced as party leader by John Bruton.

Rainbow Coalition
Bruton brought him back to the front bench in September 1992, shortly before the general election in November. In February 1994, Dukes became involved in a failed attempt to oust Bruton as leader, and subsequently resigned from the front bench. Bruton became Taoiseach in December 1994, but Dukes failed to secure a ministerial position despite being one of the most high-profile and experienced members of Fine Gael.

Two years later, in December 1996, Dukes returned as Minister for Transport, Energy and Communications following the resignation of Michael Lowry. At the 1997 general election, Dukes topped the poll in the new Kildare South constituency, but Fine Gael lost power. He became Chairman of the Irish Council of the European Movement; in this position he was very involved in advising many of the Eastern European countries who were then applying to join the European Union.

In 2001, he backed Michael Noonan in his successful bid to become leader of Fine Gael.

Career post-politics
After 21 years, Dukes lost his Dáil seat at the 2002 general election. This contest saw many high-profile casualties for Fine Gael, including Deputy Leader Jim Mitchell, former deputy leader Nora Owen and others. Many local commentators felt that Dukes' loss was down to a lack of attention to local issues, for he was highly involved in European projects and had always enjoyed a national profile.

He retired from frontline politics that year, and was subsequently appointed Director General of the Institute of International and European Affairs. He remained active within Fine Gael, and served a number of terms as the party's vice-president.

From 2001 to 2011, Dukes was President of the Alliance Francaise de Dublin, and in June 2004, the French Government appointed him Officier de la Legion d'Honneur.

In April 2004, Dukes was awarded the Commander's Cross of the Order of Merit of the Republic of Poland.

In December 2008, he was appointed by Finance Minister Brian Lenihan Jnr as a public interest director on the board of Anglo Irish Bank. The bank was subsequently nationalised, and he served on the board until the IBRC was liquidated in 2013.

In January 2009, Dukes was a judge on the TG4 reality TV show Feirm Factor.

From 2011 to 2013, Dukes served as chairman of the Board of Irish Guide Dogs for the Blind. In 2011, Dukes founded the think tank Asia Matters, which inked an agreement with the Chinese People's Association for Friendship with Foreign Countries in May 2019.

Dukes receives annual pension payments of €129,805.

Personal life
Dukes has lived in Kildare town since first being elected to represent the Kildare constituency in 1981. His wife Fionnuala is a former local politician and served as a member of Kildare County Council from 1999 until her retirement in 2009. She served as the county's mayor in 2006–07, becoming only the second woman to hold the position in the body's hundred-year history. They have two daughters.

References

1945 births
Living people
Alumni of University College Dublin
Fine Gael TDs
Institute of European Affairs
Irish people of English descent
Leaders of Fine Gael
Members of the 22nd Dáil
Members of the 23rd Dáil
Members of the 24th Dáil
Members of the 25th Dáil
Members of the 26th Dáil
Members of the 27th Dáil
Members of the 28th Dáil
Ministers for Agriculture (Ireland)
Ministers for Finance (Ireland)
Ministers for Justice (Ireland)
Ministers for Transport (Ireland)
Politicians from County Dublin
Politicians from County Kildare
Presidential appointees to the Council of State (Ireland)
People educated at Coláiste Mhuire, Dublin